Mullathpara is a village in the Palakkad district of Kerala State, South India. The headquarters is Mannarkkad Taluk. It is situated 34 km north-east of the district headquarters Palakkad, on the way to Kozhikode National Highway 213 (NH-213) and in the foothills of the Western Ghats. Silent Valley (a tropical evergreen rain forest with an unbroken evolutionary history of 50 million years) is only 45 km from Mullathpara.

Education
The village has only one school (seventh day English Medium School) and most of the people in Mullathpara are uneducated and belongs to agricultural background family life occurred, In 1922 Muhammed Maniparambil begun a social renovation thinkers society.

Transportation
Mullathpara is 8 km from Mannarkkad in Kerala. Between the little town of Thachampara and Chirakkal Padi, Kanjirapuzha Dam and Park is only 10 km from Mullathpara Junction. Buses from Palakkad, Muthukurussi, Karakurussi, come to Mullathpara through Kanjirapuzha, Mannarkkad Kozhikode and Karipur airport the distance is 81.00 km.

Demographics
Even though Mullathpara is a small village the cultural harmony is like a Pooram festival, most decent peoples are living here. No any political and religious conflict recorded yet. High range of Mullathpara consists of settlers from south Kerala especially from kottayam, Pathanamthitta, Alappuzha districts and the schedule cast like Cherumar, Pananar,  Pulluvar etc. can be seen here. Mullathpara is an Agricultural society, and gulf orient income  the main products include rubber, plantain, cinnamon, pepper, coconut, areca nut, rice, banana, etc. It is expected  great changes is going to happen here after the completion of major bypass in Palakkad - Kozhikode Highway. It will change the structure of the geographical alignment. here situated irrigation canal for agriculture purpose.

Notable nearby locations
Kanjirappuzha Dam & Gardens: 12 km
Silent Valley National Park: 23 km
Siruvani dam 25 km
Salim Ali Bird Sanctuary Anakkatti:39 km
Attappady Hills:10 km
 Nottamala Hills, 6 km
 British iron bridge 6 km
 Patrakkadavu Water falls 14 km
 Meenvallam & Atla Water Falls 15 km
 Ooty, 118 km (via Mannarkkad-attappadi-ooty)

Politics
Mullath para Kongad assembly constituency is part of Palghat (Lok Sabha constituency). MB Rajesh is the present MP and K.V. Vijaya Das is the Present MLA of Kongad. Mannarkkad taluk. The local segments included with Kongad constituency are: Kanjirappuzha, Karakurissi, Thachampara and Karimba Panchayats in Mannarkkad Taluk; Keralassery, Kongad, Mankara, Mannur and Parali Panchayats in Palakkad Taluk

Tabernacle
Mostly Muslim, Hindu and Christian devotee are  here.
here belonging very old dravidas prominent colony.
CSI Church Mullath Para
Seventh Day School Chappal
Makam Mosque Mullath Para
Asari colony Bhagavathi temple.
Mujahideen Islamic study Centre (proposed)

People and Establishes
State level School student Choreographer- Radhakrishnan M

General Engineers Architects - Noushad K

Tipu Sultan road
Mullathpara By the 18th century, all the petty kingdoms of Kerala had been absorbed or subordinated by three big states of Travancore, Calicut (ruled by Zamorins/ samuthiri) and Cochin. The Kingdom of Mysore, nominally ruled by the Wodeyar family, rose to prominence in India after the decline of the Mughal empire. In 1761, Hyder Ali seized control of all of the reins of power in Mysore by overthrowing a powerful minister and became the "de facto" head of Mysore Kingdom. He turned his attention towards expansion which included the capture of the Kingdoms of Bednur (Ikkeri or Keladi[2]), Sunda, Sera, and Canara. In 1766, he descended into Malabar and occupied the Kingdoms of Chirakkal (former Kolathunad), Kottayam, Kadathanad, Calicut, Valluvanad and Palghat and King of Cochin accepted his suzerainty and paid him tribute annually for from 1766 till 1790. Faruqabad, near Calicut, was the local capital of the Mysore-ruled Kerala.

References

Villages in Palakkad district
Populated places in Kerala